Ivan Karnilin (Russian: Иван Николаевич Карнилин, born 17 January 1957) is a Russia politician. He served as head of Nizhny Novgorod.

Early life 
Ivan Nikolaevich Karnilin was born in the village of Krasnoe, Sechenovsky District, Gorky Region.

He worked at Gorky Automobile Plant as a mechanic to repair stamps.

In the spring of 1975 he was drafted into the army, where he served in the communications forces.

Career 
Since 1978, he worked at the plant "Heat exchanger" as a technologist and head of tool shop 42.

From 1980 to 1985 he served as the first secretary of the committee Komsomol and the plant "Heat exchanger", the first secretary of the Republic of Kazakhstan Komsomol.

In 1980 he joined the CPSU.

In 1982 he graduated from Gorky Polytechnic Institute with a specialty of "mechanical engineer".

From 1985 to 1987 he worked as head of the department, head of the instrument shop of PO "Heat exchanger".

From 1987 to 1994 he served as deputy Chairman of the Leninsky District Executive Committee; Deputy Head of the Leninsky District Administration.

From 2010 to 2015 he was Deputy General Director of ZAO TechnoMashHolding.  The company closed in 2013 with a loss of 159.6 million rubles.  However, in 2014–2015 it became profitable.

In 2014, as a deputy of the city duma, Karnilin declared incomes for 788.5 thousand rubles from: ZAO TehnoMashHolding, City Council, OOO VIKA LLC.  In the list of his property were two land plots in Gorodetsky and Kstovsky districts (916 m  2 , 1 977 m  2 ), 1/4 share in the right to an apartment (287.5 m  2 ), residential building (120.7 m  2 ) and a Toyota Land Cruiser 200.  A candidate for deputies declared an account in PJSC Transkapitalbank in the amount of 1,418 million rubles and a share in LLC FIRM VIKA (33%) and LLC NSF GRANIT (0.00462%).  Karnilin, together with his brothers Vladimir Vitalyevich and Igor Vitalyevich Korolev, were co-owners of LLC Firma VIKA, the hotel complex Alexander Garden at the St. George Congress in Nizhny Novgorod. The net profit at the end of 2015 amounted to 1.4 million rubles.  Nizhny Novgorod Insurance Company GRANIT LLC was excluded from Incorporation on August 11, 2016.

Political activity 
In 1994 he was elected a deputy of the City Duma of Nizhny Novgorod.

From 1994 to 2001 he was Chairman of the Nizhny Novgorod City Council.

From 2002 to 2010, he was chairman of the 4th convocation of the Nizhny Novgorod city duma.

In 2010, he was elected to the City Council of the 5th convocation, where he worked as a member of the standing committee on budget, financial and tax policy.

On October 7, 2015, he became the head of Nizhny Novgorod, the chairman of the Nizhny Novgorod City Council of the 6th convocation.

On May 23, 2017, he wrote a statement asking for the dismissal of the head of Nizhny Novgorod. On May 24, the resignation was accepted by deputies of the Nizhny Novgorod City Council.

Family 
He married Albina Karnilina, with whom he had a daughter Irina Ovchinnikova (Karnilina) and a son Nikolay Karnilin.

Scandals 
In December 2016 opposition leader Alexei Navalny posted a video of an investigation, the hero of which became Ivan Karnilin. As it turned out, his wife purchased in 2013 and 2014 two apartments in Miami, for a total amount of almost US$2 million.

References 

1957 births
United Russia politicians
21st-century Russian politicians
Living people
Mayors of Nizhny Novgorod